Mary Elizabeth Bentley (born December 26, 1961) is a businesswoman from Perryville, Arkansas, who is a Republican member of the Arkansas House of Representatives for District 73, which encompasses parts of Yell, Pope, Perry, and Conway counties in the central portion of her state.

On March 16, 2021, Bentley introduced House Bill 1749 which sought to provide safeguards for teachers who address students by other than their preferred name or pronouns. She argued in support of the bill by saying, "It's helping those professors and teachers in our schools that do not want to be sued for not using a certain person's pronoun." Human rights advocates said that the bill targeted transgender people.

In 2021, she sponsored legislation to allow the teaching of the pseudoscientific religious theory of creationism in public schools.

References

1961 births
Living people
Republican Party members of the Arkansas House of Representatives
Women state legislators in Arkansas
People from Perry County, Arkansas
Businesspeople from Arkansas
Baptists from Arkansas
21st-century American politicians
21st-century American women politicians